The River Cover is a river in the Yorkshire Dales in North Yorkshire, England. The Yorkshire Dales Rivers Trust has a remit to conserve the ecological condition of the River Cover. The river forms a limestone dale with ancient woodlands.

Course

The source of the river lies in the shake holes that are found between Buckden Pike and Great Whernside that feed many small gills, such as East Stone Gill, West Stone Gill and Downs Gill. Where these conjoined flows meet Hazel Bank Gill is where the river becomes known as the River Cover. It flows in a north-east direction past Woodale, Braidley and Horsehouse. It turns to the north north-east towards Gammersgill before returning north-east between West Scrafton and Carlton, North Yorkshire.  Immediately east of Agglethorpe, the river turns east until it joins the River Ure south-east of Middleham.

Ecology

The river is home for brown trout and grayling.

Geology

The river runs along a U-shaped glacial valley over Great Scar limestone with Yoredale rock forming the valley sides. It is a gently meandering river with a characteristic stony channel and beaches leading to wooded low banks. The wooded areas extend up into the many gills that join the river.

Lists

Tributaries
 Hem Gill Brook
 Middle Gill
 Slape Gill
 Crab Gill
 Burn Gill
 West Gill
 Lords Gill
 Ridge Gill
 Fall Gill
 Slate Gill
 Pear Tree Gill
 Short Gill
 Side Gill

 Harkers Gill
 Dixon Gill
 Arkleside Gill
 Deer Close Gill
 Hindlethwaite Gill
 Fleemis Gill
 Turn Beck
 Goodmans Gill
 Great Gill
 Clint Gill
 Thorow Gill
 Humph Gill
 South Runner
 Caldbergh Gill
 Red beck Gill

Settlements
 Woodale
 Braidley
 Arkleside
 Horsehouse
 Swineside
 Gammersgill
 West Scrafton
 Carlton
 Melmerby
 Caldbergh
 Agglethorpe
 Middleham

Crossings
 Cover Bridge
 Braidley Footbridge
 Arkleside Bridge
 Footbridge near Hindlethwaite Hall
 Track to Hindlethwaite Hall
 Hall Farm stepping stones
 Nathwaite Bridge
 Caygill Footbridge
 Bird Ridding Bridge (footbridge)
 St Simon's Bridge (footbridge)
 Coverham Bridge
 Hullo Bridge (footbridge)
 Straight Lane stepping stones 
 A6108 Cover Bridge

Gallery

See also
Coverdale
Rivers of the United Kingdom

References

External links 

Cover
Coverdale (dale)